Jiangmen East railway station, formerly Jiangmen railway station, is an elevated station on the Guangzhou–Zhuhai intercity railway Jiangmen Spur Line.

The station is located at the junction of Wuyi Road and Donghai Road in the Jianghai District of Jiangmen City, Guangdong Province, China, near the Jiangmen National-Level High-Tech Industry Development Zone and the Jianghai District Government and Jianghai First Secondary School. It started operations on 7January 2011. Jiangmen station was renamed Jiangmen East station in English and Chinese on 10 March 2017. A former freight-only station was renamed Jiangmen railway station and opened to passenger services on 15 November 2020.

References

Jiangmen
Railway stations in China opened in 2011
Railway stations in Guangdong